This is a list of directors of the National Museum of Brazil. The Nacional Museum is one of Brazil's scientific institutions.

References 

National Museum of Brazil, Directors
National Museum of Brazil
Brazil culture-related lists